Iron Latch is a  nature reserve in Eight Ash Green, west of Colchester in Essex.

The site consists of areas of species-rich grassland and ash woodland. Bird's foot trefoil provides food for common blue butterflies, and other butterflies include purple hairstreaks. Nightingales nest in the trees and hedges.

There is access from Iron Latch Lane.

The woods are currently being destroyed by indiscriminate digging and remodelling of the land by cyclists using the area as a race track. They also leave large quantities of rubbish all over the woods.

References

Essex Wildlife Trust